Gregors Creek is a rural locality in the Somerset Region, Queensland, Australia.

History 
The locality derives its name from the creek, which in turn was named by surveyor Robert Austin after pioneer Andrew Gregor who was killed on 10 October 1846 after being attacked by Aboriginals.

The Deer Reserve State Forest is in the east of the locality.

Geography
The Brisbane River flows through from west to south-west. Gregors Creek (the watercourse) flows through from north-east to south-west, where it enters the Brisbane River.

Road infrastructure
The Brisbane Valley Highway runs along the south-western boundary.

References

Further reading 

 

Suburbs of Somerset Region
Localities in Queensland